IntelliMouse is a series of computer mice from Microsoft. The IntelliMouse series is credited with a number of innovations; Microsoft was among the first mouse vendors to introduce a scroll wheel, an optical mouse, and dedicated auxiliary buttons on the side of the mouse. They use IntelliPoint drivers and its main competitor through the years has been Logitech.

History
The original IntelliMouse was introduced on July 22, 1996, with its stand-out feature being a scroll wheel. Its design was based on that of the Microsoft Mouse 2.0 from 1993.

In November 1997 Microsoft released the IntelliMouse TrackBall, using a finger-operated trackball to control the cursor and featuring the signature IntelliMouse scroll wheel. In May 1998 the IntelliMouse Pro was released, a redesign of the original IntelliMouse that featured an asymmetrical shape (intended for right-hand use) with a more pronounced arch profile.

The IntelliMouse Explorer was introduced on April 19, 1999, at COMDEX. This version featured IntelliEye optical tracking technology, eliminating the need for a mouse ball or mousepad. It had five buttons (two on top, a scroll wheel that could be depressed, and two on the left side of the mouse). It was asymmetrical and designed for right-handed users. Microsoft called it the "most radical computer mouse technology and design advancement" since computer mice were introduced in the 1960s. The Explorer was finished in silver, and featured a glowing red "taillight" to emphasize its optical sensor. In May, the IntelliMouse Explorer was exhibited at E3 1999, touting the benefits of its optical sensor for accuracy and reliability. It was released on October 4, 1999. In 2005, PC World named the IntelliMouse Explorer to its list of "The 50 Greatest Gadgets of the Past 50 Years" as the first mainstream optical mouse.

The IntelliMouse Optical was announced in January 2000 ahead of its April release. The IntelliMouse Optical had similar styling and features as the 1999 IntelliMouse Explorer, but used a symmetric, ambidextrous design to accommodate use by the left hand. It had five buttons – two on top, the scroll wheel, and one on each side of the mouse. The optical sensor and the plug-and-play USB connection led Microsoft to tout the IntelliMouse Optical as an ideal travel companion for laptop users. The IntelliMouse Optical received an Industrial Design Excellence Award in 2001, and was included in the "Workspheres" exhibit held at the New York MoMA in 2001.

New versions of the IntelliMouse Explorer and Optical were introduced in September 2001 alongside the first wireless variant, the Wireless IntelliMouse Explorer. While the original IntelliEye sensor sampled images at 1500 frames per second (fps), the new version sampled images at 6000 fps. In addition, finger grooves and an enhanced grip were added to the new IntelliMouse Explorer.

The Wireless IntelliMouse Explorer for Bluetooth was released in 2002, both as a separate product and with a wireless keyboard in the Wireless Optical Desktop for Bluetooth bundle. Updated versions of the IntelliMouse Explorer and Wireless Explorer were released in September 2003, featuring a tilting scroll wheel to enable horizontal scrolling; the new mice were also available in a variety of colors. Two additional finishes, Cobalt Basin and Crimson Fire, were released for the Wireless IntelliMouse Explorer in July 2004. The IntelliMouse Explorer was later discontinued, then re-released as the IntelliMouse Explorer 3.0 in August 2006 with a gaming emphasis, using a 9000 fps sensor.

On October 17, 2017, Microsoft revived the series with the new Classic IntelliMouse, featuring a new dark look based on the IntelliMouse Explorer 3.0 design and featuring BlueTrack technology, allowing it to be used on glass surfaces. The Classic IntelliMouse was released in June 2018 in the UK. The ergonomic shape of the IntelliMouse Explorer 3.0 influenced many later mice, particularly gaming-focused models. The Razer DeathAdder, SteelSeries Rival, ZOWIE EC2-A and many others.

In May 2019, Microsoft announced the Pro IntelliMouse, which put an upgraded sensor in the Classic IntelliMouse body.

Notes

Gallery

References 

Computer mice
Microsoft peripherals